The Jules Léger Prize for New Chamber Music is a Canadian contemporary classical music award given to composers in recognition of quality new works of chamber music. Granted annually since 1978 (with the exception of 1984 and 1990 when no prize was given), the prize is won through a competition administered by the Canadian Music Centre. Prior to 1991, the competition had been administered by the Canadian Music Council.

History
The Jules Léger Prize was founded by Canadian diplomat and statesman Jules Léger in 1978 with the purpose "to encourage Canadian composers to write for chamber music ensembles and to foster the performance of Canadian music by these groups." Works which are eligible for competition must be written for no more than twelve performers and no less than two. Any Canadian citizen and anyone who has lived on Canadian soil for over a year is eligible to compete in the competition. Composers who are awarded the prize receive a trophy designed by the Canadian sculptor Louis Archambault, a cash award (currently $7,500), and a concert performance of the winning work by leading Canadian musicians (most of these concerts have also been broadcast on CBC Radio).

Winners

See also

Félix Award
Calixa-Lavallée Award

References

External links
 

Composer Homepages
Pierre Alexandre Tremblay
Thierry Tidrow
Nicole Lizée
Zosha Di Castri
Cassandra Miller
Justin Christensen

 
Canadian music awards
Awards established in 1978
1978 establishments in Canada